is a railway station in the city of Mizuho, Gifu Prefecture, Japan, operated by the private railway operator Tarumi Railway.

Lines

Station layout
Jūkujō Station has one ground-level side platform serving a single bi-directional track. The station is unattended. There is no station building.

Adjacent stations

|-
!colspan=5|Tarumi Railway

History
Jūkujō Station opened on March 20, 1956.

Surrounding area
 Goroku River

See also
 List of Railway Stations in Japan

References

External links

 

Railway stations in Gifu Prefecture
Railway stations in Japan opened in 1956
Stations of Tarumi Railway
Mizuho, Gifu